Tamir “Seth” Saban (תמיר סבן; born October 19, 1999) is an American-Israeli professional basketball player for Maccabi Haifa of the Liga Leumit. Standing at 6 ft 3 in (1.91 meters), he primarily plays at the shooting guard and point guard positions.

In 2015, he attended Milken Community Schools, where he led the school's basketball team in average points per game during the 2015–2016 basketball season.

The following year (2016-2017), Saban transferred to and played basketball for Crossroads School in Santa Monica, California. Saban graduated from the Crossroads School in 2018.

He then attended and played basketball for El Camino College.

References

External links
Instagram page

1999 births
Living people
American men's basketball players
Basketball players from Los Angeles
El Camino Warriors athletes
Ironi Nes Ziona B.C. players
Israeli men's basketball players
Junior college men's basketball players in the United States
Maccabi Rishon LeZion basketball players